The palmar branch of the ulnar nerve arises about five cm proximal to the wrist from where the ulnar nerve splits into palmar and dorsal branches. It supplies sensory innervation to a small area in the palmar surface of the wrist.

The palmar branch represents the continuation of the ulnar nerve as it crosses the flexor retinaculum of the hand on the lateral side of the pisiform bone, medial to and a little behind the ulnar artery.

Some sources state that it ends by dividing into a superficial and a deep branch. (Other sources state that the superficial branch of ulnar nerve and deep branch of ulnar nerve are the terminal branches of the ulnar nerve itself.)

Additional Images

References

External links
  - palmar at left

Nerves of the upper limb